The Lenzerhorn (also spelled Lenzer Horn) is a mountain of the Plessur Alps, located east of Lenzerheide in the canton of Graubünden. It has an elevation of 2,906 metres and is, after the Aroser Rothorn, the second highest peak of the Plessur Alps.

References

External links
 Lenzerhorn on Hikr

Mountains of the Alps
Mountains of Switzerland
Mountains of Graubünden
Two-thousanders of Switzerland
Lantsch/Lenz